Himanshu is a given name. Notable people with the name include:

Himanshu Asnora (born 1995), Indian cricketer
Himanshu Bhatt actor who plays Mrityunjay Viswa karma in the film Login
Himanshu Bisht (born 1996), Indian cricketer
Himanshu Chawla (born 1991), Indian first-class cricketer
Himanshu Dhanuka, Bengali film producer and distributor
Himanshu Gulati (born 1988), Norwegian politician representing the Progress Party
Himanshu Hari (born 1994), Indian cricketer
Gajendra Prasad Himanshu, veteran socialist leader from Bihar, India
Himanshu Jangra (born 2004), Indian footballer
Himanshu Khagta (born 1990), Indian photographer based in the Indian Himalayas
Himanshu Malhotra, Indian actor
Himanshu Malik, Indian actor, screenwriter and producer known for his works in Bollywood
Himanshu Mantri (born 1994), Indian cricketer
Himanshu Pandya, Indian academic, Vice Chancellor of Gujarat University, Ahmedabad, Gujarat, India
Himanshu Parikh, Indian engineer
Himanshu Rai (1892–1940), pioneer of Indian cinema, founder of the studio in 1934, along with Devika Rani
Himanshu Rana (born 1998), Indian cricketer
Himanshu Prabha Ray (born 1947), Sanskrit scholar, historian, and archaeologist
Himanshu Roy (1963–2018), Indian police officer, Additional Director General of Police (ADGP) of Maharashtra
Himanshu Sangwan (born 1995), Indian cricketer
Himanshu Sharma, Indian film writer and producer who works in Hindi cinema
Himanshu Suri (born 1985), stage name Heems, American rapper from Queens in New York City
Himanshu Thakur (born 1994), alpine skier from India